The Battle of Montmeló took place on 28 March 1642 in Montmeló, Catalonia during the Reapers' War. A Franco-Catalan army under the command of Philippe de La Mothe-Houdancourt fought and defeated a smaller Spanish force under Gerolamo Caracciolo.

Battles of the Reapers' War
1642 in Spain
Montmelo
Montmelo
Conflicts in 1642
Montmeló